The Tchaikovsky Symphony Orchestra is a Russian classical music radio orchestra established in 1930. It was founded as the Moscow Radio Symphony Orchestra, and served as the official symphony for the Soviet All-Union Radio network.

History
Following the dissolution of the Soviet Union in 1991, the orchestra was renamed in 1993 by the Russian Ministry of Culture in recognition of the central role the music of Tchaikovsky plays in its repertoire. The current music director is Vladimir Fedoseyev, who has been in that position since 1974.

During Soviet times, the orchestra was sometimes known as the USSR State Radio and Television Symphony Orchestra, the USSR State Radio Symphony Orchestra, or the USSR All-Union National Radio and Central Television Symphony Orchestra.

Music Directors
Vladimir Fedoseyev (1974–)
Gennady Rozhdestvensky (1961–1974)
Alexander Gauk (1953–1961)
Nikolai Golovanov (1937–1953)
Alexander Orlov (1930–1937)

Selected discography

Moscow Radio Symphony Orchestra
Fine: Symphonic Music of Irving Fine Delos DE 3139
Mahler: Symphony No. 9 in D major BIS BIS-CD-632 Orchestral
Sibelius: Symphony No. 1 in E Minor, Op. 39 Westminster Gold WG-8361
Tchaikovsky Cycle (The) (6 DVD Box Set) (NTSC) Arthaus Musik 102119 Classical Concert
Tchaikovsky: Symphony No. 1 / Rococo Variations (Tchaikovsky Cycle, Vol. 1) (NTSC) Arthaus Musik 102121 Classical Concert
Tchaikovsky: Symphony No. 2 / Eugene Onegin (excerpts) (Tchaikovsky Cycle, Vol. 2) (NTSC) Arthaus Musik 102123 Classical Concert
Tchaikovsky: Symphony No. 3 / Swan Lake (excerpts) (Tchaikovsky Cycle, Vol. 3) (NTSC) Arthaus Musik 102125 Classical Concert
Tchaikovsky: Symphony No. 4 / Violin Concerto (Tchaikovsky Cycle, Vol. 4) (NTSC) Arthaus Musik 102127 Classical Concert
Tchaikovsky: Symphony No. 5 / Piano Concerto No. 2 (Tchaikovsky Cycle, Vol. 5) (NTSC) Arthaus Musik 102129 Classical Concert
Tchaikovsky: Symphony No. 6 / Piano Concerto No. 1 (Tchaikovsky Cycle, Vol. 6) (NTSC) Arthaus Musik 102131 Classical Concert

Moscow Radio Tchaikovsky Symphony Orchestra
Classical Meditation Naxos 8.570364-65 Concertos, Orchestral, Chamber Music, Choral - Sacred, Choral - Secular
Pavlova: Symphonies Nos. 2 and 4 Naxos 8.557566 Orchestral
Pavlova: Symphony No. 5 / Elegy Naxos 8.570369 Orchestral

See also
Boris Gusman

External links
Biography
Homepage (in English)
Homepage (in Russian)

Musical groups established in 1930
Russian symphony orchestras
Radio and television orchestras
Pyotr Ilyich Tchaikovsky
1930 establishments in Russia
Radio in Russia
Soviet musical groups
Radio in the Soviet Union